Marsh Spur is a spur in the eastern Voden Heights about  south of Bildad Peak and 4.5 nautical miles west of Scar Inlet on the east side of Graham Land, Antarctica. The spur is important geologically for the contact between basement complex gneisses and volcanics of probable Upper Jurassic age. The spur was named by the UK Antarctic Place-Names Committee for Anthony F. Marsh, a British Antarctic Survey geologist at Fossil Bluff and Hope Bay, 1963–65.

References

Ridges of Graham Land
Oscar II Coast